The Music Producers Guild (MPG) (UK) promotes and represents all individuals in the music production and recording professions. It is a professional organisation that embodies collective and individual creative contributions to the production and recording of all genres of music and media related activities. As a guild, the organisation has no political party affiliation.

The organisation presents the Music Producers Guild Awards annually. In 2008, the MPG and BPI coordinated their awards programmes. The MPG awards are sponsored by, amongst others,  Shure and are intended to recognise the talent and ability of producers, engineers, mixers and remixers. At the 2013 MPG awards, George Martin received 'The Outstanding Contribution to UK Music' award.

Conceived and supported by producers and engineers who are passionate about all aspects of creating and recording music, it provides a community to share collective experiences and collaborate with other like-minded people.

Membership is open to all producers, engineers, mixers, re-mixers, programmers, sound designers, mastering engineers, students, enthusiasts – everyone who shares delight in and dedication to the creation of music and audio.

MPG members include Paul Epworth, Bernard Butler, Mike Crossey, Jake Gosling and Tommy D.

References

External links

Music organisations based in the United Kingdom
Entertainment industry unions
Cultural organisations based in London